Erythritol tetranitrate (ETN) is an explosive compound chemically similar to PETN, though it is thought to be slightly more sensitive to friction and impact.

Like many nitrate esters, ETN acts as a vasodilator, and was the active ingredient in the original "sustained release"  tablets, made under a process patent in the early 1950s, called "nitroglyn". Ingesting ETN or prolonged skin contact can lead to absorption and what is known as a "nitro headache".

Properties
ETN has a relatively high velocity of detonation of 8206 m/s at a density of 1.7219 (±0.0025) g/cm3. It is white in color and odorless. ETN is commonly cast into mixtures with other high explosives. It is somewhat sensitive to shock and friction, so care needs to be taken while handling. ETN dissolves readily in acetone and other ketone solvents. The impact and friction sensitivity is slightly higher than the sensitivity of pentaerythritol tetranitrate
(PETN). The sensitivity of melt cast and pressed ETN is comparable. Lower nitrates of erythritol, such as erythritol trinitrate, are soluble in water, so they do not contaminate most ETN samples.

Much like PETN, ETN is known for having a very long shelf life. Studies that directly observed the crystalline structure saw no signs of decomposition after four years of storage at room temperature. ETN has a melting point of 61 °C, compared to PETN which has a melting point of 141.3 °C. Recent studies of ETN decomposition suggested a unimolecular rate-limiting step in which the O−NO2 bond is cleaved and begins the decomposition sequence.

ETN can and should be recrystallized, as to remove the trapped acids from synthesis. Warm ethanol or methanol is a viable solvent (close to 10 g of ETN/100 ml EtOH). ETN will precipitate as big platelets with bulk density of about 0.3 g/cm3 (fluffy material) when the ETN/ethanol solution is quickly poured into several liters of cold water. Smaller, fine crystals are produced by slow addition of water in said ETN/ethanol solution with intense mixing. Very fine  crystals can be prepared by shock cooling of warm ETN/ethanol solution in a below −20 °C cooling bath. ETN can be easily hand pressed to about 1.2 g/cm3 (with a slight risk of accidental detonation).

Even small samples of ETN on the order of 20 mg can cause relatively powerful explosions verging on detonation when heated without confinement, e.g. when placed on a layer of aluminium foil and heated with flame from below.

ETN can be melt-cast in warm (about 65 °C) water. Slight decomposition is possible (often displayed by change in color from white to very light yellow). Nonetheless, no reports of runaway reactions leading to explosion have been confirmed (when melt-casting using only a bucket of warm water and recrystallized ETN). Melt-cast ETN, if cooled down slowly over a period of 10–30 minutes, has density of 1.70 g/cm3, detonation velocity of 8040 m/s, and Pcj detonation pressure of about 300 kbar. Its brisance is far higher than that of Semtex (about 220 kbar, depending on brand)
Mixtures of melt-cast ETN with PETN (about 50:50% by weight) are about the most brisant explosives that can be produced by moderately equipped amateurs. These mixtures have Pcj slightly above 300 kbar and detonation velocity above 8 km/s. This is close to the maximum of fielded military explosives like LX-10 or EDC-29 (about 370 kbar and close to 9 km/s).

ETN is often plasticized using PIB/synthethic oil binders (very comparable to the binder system in C4) or using liquid nitric esters. The PIB-based plastic explosives are nontoxic and completely comparable to C4 or Semtex with Pcj of 200–250 kbar, depending on density (influenced by crystal size, binder amount, and amount of final rolling). EGDN/ETN/NC systems are toxic to touch, quite sensitive to friction and impact, but generally slightly more powerful than C4 (Pcj of about 250 kbar and Edet of 5.3 MJ/kg) and more powerful than Semtex (Pcj of about 220 kbar and Edet below 5 MJ/kg) with Pcj of about 250–270 kbar and Edet of about 6 MJ/kg. Note that different explosive software and different experimental tests will yield absolute detonation pressures that can vary by 5% or more with the relative proportions being maintained.

Melt-cast ETN gives invalid results in the Hess test, i.e. the deformation is greater than 26 mm, with the lead cylinder being completely destroyed. Semtex 1A gives only 21 mm in the same test, i.e. melt-cast ETN is at least 20% more brisant than Semtex 1A.

Melt-cast ETN or high density/low inert content ETN plastic explosives are one of the materials on "watch-lists" for terrorism.

Oxygen balance
One quality this explosive has, that PETN does not, is a positive oxygen balance, which means that ETN possesses more than enough oxygen in its structure to fully oxidize all of its carbon and hydrogen upon detonation. This can be seen in the schematic chemical equation below.

2 C4H6N4O12 → 8 CO2 + 6 H2O + 4 N2 + 1 O2

Whereas PETN decomposes to:

2 C5H8N4O12 → 6 CO2 + 8 H2O + 4 N2 + 4 CO

The carbon monoxide (CO) still requires oxygen to complete oxidation to carbon dioxide (CO2). A detailed study of the decomposition chemistry of ETN has been recently elucidated.

Thus, for every two moles of ETN that decompose, one free mole of O2 is released. This oxygen could be used to oxidize an added metal dust, or an oxygen-deficient explosive, such as TNT or PETN. A chemical equation of how the oxygen from ETN with oxidizes PETN is shown below. The extra oxygen from the ETN oxidizes the carbon monoxide (CO) to carbon dioxide (CO2).

2 C4H6N4O12 + 1 C5H8N4O12 → 13 CO2 + 10 H2O + 6 N2

Manufacture
Like other nitrated polyols, ETN is made by nitrating erythritol either through the mixing of concentrated sulfuric acid and a nitrate salt, or by using a mixture of sulfuric and nitric acid.

See also 
 Mannitol hexanitrate
 Xylitol pentanitrate

References

Explosive chemicals
Nitrate esters
Sugar alcohol explosives